The Berwyn Suburban Life is a weekly newspaper published on Wednesdays in Berwyn, Illinois. The paper covers news of Berwyn, Cicero, Forest View and Stickney in western Cook County.

The Berwyn Suburban Life is published by Suburban Life Media and owned by Shaw Media.  Shaw Media's suburban group includes the Northwest Herald, Kane County Chronicle, Daily Chronicle of DeKalb, and The Herald-News of Joliet.

External links
 Berwyn Suburban Life website
 Shaw Media website

References

Newspapers published in Illinois
Berwyn, Illinois